The 2013 Slovak Open was a professional tennis tournament played on indoor hard courts. It was the 14th edition of the tournament which was part of the 2013 ATP Challenger Tour. It took place in Bratislava, Slovakia between 4 and 10 November 2013.

Singles main-draw entrants

Seeds

 1 Rankings are as of October 28, 2013.

Other entrants
The following players received wildcards into the singles main draw:
  Filip Horanský
  Miloslav Mečíř Jr.
  Lukáš Rosol
  Adrian Sikora

The following players received entry from the qualifying draw:
  Marcin Gawron
  Uladzimir Ignatik
  Boris Pašanski
  Ante Pavić

Champions

Singles

 Lukáš Lacko def.  Lukáš Rosol 6–4, 4–6, 6–4

Doubles

 Henri Kontinen /  Andreas Siljeström def.  Gero Kretschmer /  Jan-Lennard Struff 7–6(8–6), 6–2

External links
Official Website

Slovak Open
Slovak Open
Slovak Open
Slovak Open